Wernau is a town in the district of Esslingen in Baden-Württemberg southwestern Germany. It is situated on the Neckar river, 25 km southeast of Stuttgart.

Geography

Location
Wernau is located on the southeast bank of the Neckar river, south of Plochingen and about 25 km east of Stuttgart. The Bodenbach river flows through the city. In 1981 the Wernau Baggerseen (quarry ponds) were declared a wildlife preserve. Today it spans across 45 hectares. Another 5.5 hectares of wildlife preserve are located in an area of the city called the Wernau Lehmgrube (clay pits).

The small community of "Freitagshof," which lies to the South, also belongs to Wernau.

Neighboring Communities
Neighboring Wernau are the communities of Deizisau to the Northwest, Plochingen to the North, Hochdorf to the East and Notzingen to the Southeast; the cities of Kirchheim unter Teck to the South and Wendlingen to the Southwest and the community of Köngen to the West. All of them are located within and belong to the district of Esslingen am Neckar.

Land Use Distribution

Dark green: Forest 22.5%,
Yellow: Agriculture 40.9%,
Blue: Water surface 3.0%,
Lighter green: Recreational areas 3.3%,
Red: Buildings and open areas 16.0%,
Beige: Transportation surfaces 10.2%,
Purple: Other

According to data from the Statistischen Landesamtes, as of 2014.

History 

Wernau was established in 1938 by the joining of the two communities Pfauhausen and Steinbach. These communities tried to unite in 1384 and again in 1681. While the first attempt lasted a few decades, the 1681 union by Franz Josef von Wernau did not last seven years.

Up until Wernau's establishment 
In 1384 and again in 1681 an attempt was made to establish a community out of Pfauhausen and Steinbach, but these attempts failed after a short period of time. Up until 1769 Pfauhausen belonged to the sovereignty of Neuhausen from Anterior Austria. It then belonged to the Prince-Bishopric of Speyer up to 1802 and was therefore a catholic community. Steinbach also remained catholic through the Protestant Reformation under the sovereignty of the Speth von Sulzburg. This made both communities an enclave of the Catholics in the predominately Protestant land of Württemberg. Pfauhausen and Steinbach were assigned to Oberamt Esslingen in 1808 as part of the implementation of the District Reformation of Württemberg in the Kingdom of Württemberg. During NAZI-Germany both communities were fused together to form Wernau in 1938 and were assigned, as part of the NAZI District Reformation, to Esslingen.

After WWII until Present 
After World War II Wernau became a part of the American Zone of Occupation in the German state of Württemberg-Baden which was later reformed into the current German state of Baden-Württemberg in 1952. After WWII many refugees from Hungary moved to Wernau. And on On April 1, 1968, Wernau received its charter as an official city.

Demographics

Economy an Infrastructure 
Wernau is an attractive economic location. Famous companies like Bosch-Thermotechnik; the Japanese company Mori Seiki; the manufacturer of electrical component systems, 2E mechatronic; and the producer of folk costumes, Perry have settled here. Handcraft companies and wholesale businesses have also found a home in the city.

A Convention Center is located in the "Quadrium" with an indoor pool and spa. Wernau also has a public outdoor pool and an ice rink.

A public library was opened in 1971. As of 1996 it is located in a building right across from the train station. It houses 24,000 books and other printed and electronic media and in 2012 loaned out 90,000 items.

Transportation 
Wernau is connected by the Plochingen-Tübingen railway (Neckar-Alb-Bahn) to the national rail network. Since December 12, 2009 Wernau is a stop on S1 line of the S-Bahn Stuttgart. The S1 line ends in Kirchheim unter Teck.
Wernau is connected by the B 313 to the Bundesautobahn 8 and to the Bundesstraße 10, that leads to Stuttgart.

Companies based in Wernau 
 DEWETRON Elektronische Messgeräte GmbH
 Eurotubes Thomas Klein Präzisionsdrahtführer und Löttechnik
 Junkers Gasgeräte (Bosch Gruppe) / BBT Thermotechnik
 Krüger Dirndl GmbH, manufacturer of high-end traditional garments for men and women
 Prakesch Zerspanungstechnik GmbH, precision machined automotive and other parts,
 Steinpilz GmbH Softwareentwicklung
 DMG Mori AG manufacturer of cutting machine tools (DMG Mori AG)

Arts and culture 
 Maria-Hilf-Kapelle (Maria Help Chapel) from 1667, is the oldest building in Wernau
 The castle from the Baron von Palm (18th century)
 Castle of the lords of Wernau
 Old church tower of St. Erasmus with its Roman elements
 Stadtbücherei am Bahnhofsplatz (public library)
 Theater

Parks and outdoor recreation 
 Nature conservation area Wernau Quarry Ponds, bird paradise
 Natural conservation area Wernau Clay Pit
 Forest teaching path

Government

Town Council 
The Town Council has 22 seats. The Council Elections on May 26, 2019, reported the following preliminary results. The Town Council consist of elected officials (unpaid posts) and the Mayor as head of the government. The Mayor has voting power in the town council.

Old town hall of Wernau (photo at right)

Mayor 
1945–1964 Friedrich Schönherr
1964–1984 Hans Wagner
1984–2007 Roger Kehle
since 2007 Armin Elbl
On October 11, 2015, Elbl was re-elected with 93.43% of the votes.

Coat of arms 
Blazon: "In silver, a black diagonal stripe with three golden balls."

The coat of arms stems from the Herren von Wernau (Lord of Wernau), whose name is also the origin of the city's name. The three balls symbolize the legend of Nicolaus, according to which, the Bishop of Nikolaus from Myra threw three bags of gold through the window of a house where three poor girls lived, so that they could pay for their weddings.

Notable people from Wernau
 Julius Denzel (1852–1915), German chemist

International relations

Bibliography
Baumann, Michael: Wernau am Neckar, 1938–1988 aus der Reihe Archivbilder, Sutton Verlag, Erfurt 2010, .
Ferdinand Schaller: Pfauhausen und Steinbach: Wernau am Neckar in alten Tagen. Sutton Verlag, Erfurt 2009, .
Der Landkreis Esslingen – hrsg. vom Landesarchiv Baden-Württemberg i. V. mit dem Landkreis Esslingen, Jan Thorbecke Verlag, Ostfildern 2009, Band 2, Seite 477, .
Anton Denzinger, Diether Hauber: Wernau: 700 Jahre Pfauhausen und Steinbach 1276–1976. Gottlieb & Osswald, Kirchheim 1976.
Wernau is twinned with:
 Bonyhád, Hungary

External links 
  
 Drawings of the towns Pfauhausen and Steinbach which joined together to become Wernau. These are taken from the Forstlagerbuch (forestry stock book) from Andreas Kieser, 1685 (Hauptstaatsarchiv Stuttgart).

Sources

Esslingen (district)
Populated places on the Neckar basin
Populated riverside places in Germany
Württemberg